This is a list of women who have been elected or appointed  deputy head of government of their respective countries. This list includes female deputy heads of government who are concurrently female deputy heads of state.

List

Italics denotes acting deputy head of government and states that are either de facto (with limited to no international recognition) or defunct.

See also
Council of Women World Leaders
List of current state leaders by date of assumption of office
List of elected and appointed female heads of state and government
List of elected or appointed female deputy heads of state
Women in government

References

External links 

 

 Deputy
Heads of state
Female Heads of state
Elected or appointed deputy heads of government